Pacific Opera is an opera company based in Sydney, Australia.

Founded in 2003 by Sylvie Renaud-Calmel and Christine Douglas, the first artistic director, the company has an annual Young Artist Program for emerging opera singers aged 18 to 35, which integrates coaching, rehearsals and stage craft with numerous public and private performance opportunities. Annual opera productions offer role practice to the young artists and employment for young industry professionals including designers, orchestral musicians, repetiteurs, conductors and directors.

Simon Kenway was artistic direct from 2015 to 2019, followed by Peter Coleman-Wright.

Productions
2003: The Magic Flute, The Independent Theatre, North Sydney
2004: Hansel and Gretel, The Independent Theatre, North Sydney
2005: Così fan tutte, The Independent Theatre, North Sydney, and Riverside Theatres, Parramatta
2006: Pacific Opera in Concert 2006, The Independent Theatre, North Sydney
2007: The Barber of Seville; Pacific Opera in Concert 2007 The Independent Theatre, North Sydney, and Riverside Theatres, Parramatta.
2008: Daphnis and Chloe and Gorgeous Galatea, The Independent Theatre, North Sydney
2009: La sonnambula, Glen Street Theatre, Belrose
2010: Hänsel und Gretel. Glen Street Theatre, Belrose
2011: The Magic Flute, Llewelynn Hall Canberra with the Canberra Symphony Orchestra, Glen Street Theatre, Belrose, and Riverside Theatres, Parramatta
2012: "Opera at the Forum", The Italian Cultural Forum, Leichhardt
2013: The Marriage of Figaro, Riverside Theatres, Parramatta, and Young Town Hall, Young
2014: The Gondoliers Dream Getaway, Riverside Theatres, Parramatta
2015: The Cunning Little Vixen, New Hall, Sydney Grammar School, Sydney

References

External links
 

Australian opera companies
Culture of Sydney
2003 establishments in Australia
Musical groups established in 2003